Dhruba Ghosh (1957 - 2017) was an Indian classical musician and Sarangi player from Mumbai.

Biography
Dhruba Ghosh was born in 1957 in Mumbai. His father Padma Bhushan Pt Nikhil Ghosh was a famous musician, teacher and writer, known his proficiency on the percussion instrument of tabla. He is the nephew of Pt Pannalal Ghosh, famous flute player and composer. Dhruba Ghosh learned the basics of sarangi from Dattaram Parvatakar of All India Radio, Ustad Ali Akbar Khan and Ustad Sagiruddin Khan. His brother Nayan Ghosh is also a musician and a tabla player. He worked in 'Miho: A journey to the mountain', a musical album. This album won the Grammy Award. He also worked in various fusion albums. Pandit Dhruba Ghosh died 10 July 2017 in Mumbai, India.

He also studied under the guidance of vocalist Pandit Dinkar Kaikini.

Albums
Miho: A journey to the mountain

Awards
Sangeet Nataka Akademi Award
Paul Winter cost, an American musical band including Dhruba Ghosh won the Grammy Award.

Disciples
Unfortunately, very few disciples of his are known, some of them are:
1. Yuji Nakagawa, http://yujisarangi.com/
2. Vanraj Shastri
3. Deepak Paramshivan , https://www.deepakparamashivan.com/

References

External links
Dhurba Ghosh - sarangi.net
Raag Yaman recital in Basant Bahar

1957 births
2017 deaths
People from Mumbai
Indian musicians
Indian male composers
Hindustani instrumentalists
Sarangi players
Recipients of the Sangeet Natak Akademi Award